Abbe is both a surname and a given name. Notable people with the name include:

Surname:
Caroline Abbé (born 1988), Swiss footballer
Cleveland Abbe (1838–1916), American meteorologist
Cleveland Abbe Jr. (1872–1934), American geographer
Ernst Abbe (1840–1905), German physicist
James Abbe (1883–1975), American photographer
Kathryn Abbe (1919–2014), American photographer
Kenshiro Abbe (1915–1985), Japanese martial artist
Maurice L'Abbé (1920–2006), Canadian academic and mathematician
Moe L'Abbé (born 1947), Canadian hockey player
Robert Abbe (1851–1928), American surgeon and radiologist
Sonnet L'Abbé, Canadian poet, editor, professor and critic
Truman Abbe (1873–1955), American surgeon
William Abbe (1800–1854), Iowa state senator

Given name:
Abbe Borg (born 1943), Swedish esports player
Abbé Faria, or Abbé (Abbot) José Custódio de Faria (31 May 1756 – 20 September 1819), Luso-Goan Catholic monk who pioneered of the scientific study of hypnosis
Abbe Carter Goodloe (1867–1960), American writer
Abbe Ibrahim (born 1986), Togolese soccer player
Abbe Lane (born 1932), American singer and actress
Abbe Lowell (born 1952), American defense attorney
Abbe May (born 1983), Australian singer-songwriter, musician, and human rights campaigner
Abbe Mowshowitz (born 1939), American academic and professor
Abbe Raven, American businesswoman
Abbe Smith (born 1956), American criminal defense attorney and professor of law

Nickname:
Fulbert Youlou (1917-1972), first President of Congo-Brazzaville, known as Abbé
Joseph-Barnabé Saint-Sevin dit L'Abbé le Fils (1727–1803), French composer and violinist

Pseudonym:
Jean-Hippolyte Michon (1806-1881), French priest, archaeologist, and the founder of graphology, used the name "L’Abbé ***" to publish Le Jésuite in 1865

References